Azir Muminović (born 18 April 1997) is a Bosnian professional footballer who plays as a goalkeeper.

Club career

Early career
Muminović started his career with his hometown club Sloboda Tuzla, with whom he signed his first professional contract in October 2014. He made his professional debut in a cup game against Željezničar on 13 April 2016, days before his 19th birthday. His league debut came a month later, in an away loss to Zrinjski Mostar.

In July 2018, during a pre-season training, Muminović tore an anterior cruciate ligament of his right knee, which required a surgery and ruled him out for at least six months. In his come-back game with Sloboda, on 30 March 2019, the club tied against city rivals Tuzla City 1–1 in a league game.

In June 2019, Muminović signed a four year contract with Tuzla City for a €25,000 transfer fee. He made his official debut for Tuzla City on 20 July 2019, in a 1–5 away league win against Zvijezda 09. He surprisingly terminated his contract with the club on 23 April 2021.

International career
Muminović came through all of Bosnia and Herzegovina's youth selections.

Career statistics

Club

References

External links

1997 births
Living people
Sportspeople from Tuzla
Bosnia and Herzegovina footballers
Bosnia and Herzegovina youth international footballers
Bosnia and Herzegovina under-21 international footballers
Association football goalkeepers
FK Sloboda Tuzla players
FK Tuzla City players
Premier League of Bosnia and Herzegovina players